Dupree is a city in and county seat of Ziebach County, South Dakota, United States. The population was 494 at the 2020 census. It is the only incorporated community located fully within Ziebach County.

History
Dupree got its start in 1910, following construction of the Milwaukee Railroad through the territory. The city derives its name from Fred Dupris, a pioneer settler.

Geography
Dupree is located at  (45.050110, -101.601052).

Dupree has been assigned the ZIP code 57623 and the FIPS place code 17420.

Climate

Demographics

2010 census
As of the census of 2010, there were 525 people, 176 households, and 116 families residing in the city. The racial makeup of the city was 29.3% White, 66.9% Native American, 0.4% from other races, and 3.4% from two or more races. Hispanic or Latino of any race were 4.2% of the population.

There were 176 households, of which 44.9% had children under the age of 18 living with them, 38.1% were married couples living together, 21.6% had a female householder with no husband present, 6.3% had a male householder with no wife present, and 34.1% were non-families. 31.8% of all households were made up of individuals, and 10.8% had someone living alone who was 65 years of age or older. The average household size was 2.98 and the average family size was 3.83.

The median age in the city was 27.6 years. 37.3% of residents were under the age of 18; 9% were between the ages of 18 and 24; 22% were from 25 to 44; 23.8% were from 45 to 64; and 7.8% were 65 years of age or older. The gender makeup of the city was 46.5% male and 53.5% female.

2000 census
As of the census of 2000, there were 434 people, 146 households, and 108 families residing in the city. The population density was 1,089.8 people per square mile (418.9/km2). There were 171 housing units at an average density of 429.4 per square mile (165.1/km2). The racial makeup of the city was 28.11% White, 70.74% Native American, and 1.15% from two or more races. Hispanic or Latino of any race were 0.92% of the population.

There were 146 households, out of which 39.0% had children under the age of 18 living with them, 39.7% were married couples living together, 26.0% had a female householder with no husband present, and 26.0% were non-families. 24.0% of all households were made up of individuals, and 6.2% had someone living alone who was 65 years of age or older. The average household size was 2.97 and the average family size was 3.48.

In the city, the population was spread out, with 37.1% under the age of 18, 9.4% from 18 to 24, 24.7% from 25 to 44, 20.0% from 45 to 64, and 8.8% who were 65 years of age or older. The median age was 28 years. For every 100 females, there were 80.8 males. For every 100 females age 18 and over, there were 79.6 males.

The median income for a household in the city was $22,250, and the median income for a family was $20,781. Males had a median income of $21,667 versus $14,875 for females. The per capita income for the city was $8,206. About 41.9% of families and 52.1% of the population were below the poverty line, including 77.4% of those under age 18 and 17.0% of those age 65 or over.

See also
 List of cities in South Dakota

References

External links

Cities in South Dakota
Cities in Ziebach County, South Dakota
County seats in South Dakota
Populated places established in 1910
1910 establishments in South Dakota